UNESCO leads the United Nations Literacy Decade (UNLD) under the slogan of "Literacy as Freedom". Launched at UN Headquarters in 2003, the Decade aims to increase literacy levels and  empower all people everywhere. In declaring this Decade, the international community recognised that the promotion of literacy is in the interest of all, as part of efforts towards peace, respect and exchange in a globalizing world.

History
At the request of the UN General Assembly, UNESCO is coordinating the Decade and its international activities. UNESCO launched the Literacy Initiative for Empowerment (LIFE) in 2005 as a framework for achieving the Decade's goals.

The UN Literacy Decade expresses the collective will of the international community to promote a literate environment for all, girls and boys, women and men in both developing and developed countries. The Decade was established for three reasons:

 On a global scale, one in five adults cannot read nor write. According to the latest estimates, 776 million people are illiterate and two-thirds of these are women.
 Literacy is a human right. Basic education, within which literacy is the key learning tool, was recognised as a human right over 50 years ago, in the Universal Declaration of Human Rights. This right continues to be violated for a large proportion of humanity.
 Literacy efforts up to now have proved inadequate, at national and international levels. The Decade is an opportunity to make a sustained collective effort which will go beyond one-shot programmes or campaigns.

In response to these factors, efforts undertaken during the Decade are to target the poorest and most marginal social groups (including women) and to accompany initiatives to reduce poverty. According to the draft proposal and plan for the UNLD, "Literacy policies and programmes today require going beyond the limited view of literacy that has dominated in the past. Literacy for all requires a renewed vision of literacy…." In order to survive in today‘s globalized world, it has become necessary for everyone to learn new forms of literacy and to develop the ability to locate, evaluate and effectively use information in a variety of ways.

Resolution 56/116 adopted by the General Assembly entitled United Nations Literacy Decade: education for all  evokes that literacy is crucial to the acquisition, by every child, youth and adult, of essential life skills that enable them to address the challenges they can face in life, and represents an essential step in basic education, which is an indispensable means for effective participation in the societies and economies of the twenty-first century. It also affirms that the realization of the right to education, especially for girls, contributes to the eradication of poverty.

The Education for All goal of increasing literacy rates by 50% by 2015 provides the overall target for the Decade, and the Millennium Development Goals set the Decade in the context of poverty reduction.

United Nations Literacy Decade - International Plan of Action 

As part of its lead coordination role in the Decade, UNESCO prepared the International Plan of Action for the Literacy Decade. The International Plan of Action outlines the strategy and expected outcomes for the Decade. It proposes six key areas of action to implement literacy for all:

 Policy change to provide a framework for local participation in literacy;
 Development of flexible programmes;
 Capacity building for literacy workers;
 Research;
 Community participation; and
 Monitoring and evaluation to measure progress in the respective regions.

The Plan was submitted to the UN General Assembly at its 57th session in 2002.

UNESCO's Literacy Initiative for Empowerment (LIFE) 
 
UNESCO's Literacy Initiative for Empowerment (LIFE) is a global strategic framework for the implementation of United Nations Literacy Decade (2003–2012), in order to meet the Education for All (EFA) goals, with particular focus on adult literacy and out-of-school children. It was created when it became apparent that existing literacy efforts would not be sufficient to achieve a 50 per cent improvement in levels of adult literacy by 2015. LIFE targets the 35 countries that have a literacy rate of less than 50 percent or a population of more than 10 million people who cannot read nor write. Eighty-five percent of the world's non-literate population resides in these countries, and two-thirds are women and girls. The UNESCO Institute for Lifelong Learning (UIL) is coordinating LIFE.

UNLD Mid-Decade Review 

Halfway through the United Nations Literacy Decade (UNLD) 2003-2012, UNESCO has conducted a review of progress. The review has been a key opportunity to take stock and set a clear direction for the promotion of literacy between 2007 and 2012 in all key areas of the UNLD Plan of Action.

Taking place during 2007 and 2008, the review has used the 2006 Education for All Global Monitoring Report  as a benchmark. It also used the momentum generated from the Regional Conferences to promote stronger policies and greater investment in literacy. The review aimed to identify concrete actions for the second half of the Decade. UNESCO has set up a UNLD Experts' Group which advised on the further development of the UN Literacy Decade as well as on other literacy related matters. The results of the mid-decade review have been submitted to the UN General Assembly in October 2008.

See also
 International Literacy Year
 International Literacy Day
 List of international literacy prizes
 Education for All
 Literacy

References

External links
 UN Resolution 56/116 on the United Nations Literacy Decade: Education for All
 UNESCO Literacy Portal; Literacy Initiative for Empowerment (LIFE) 2006-2015
 UNESCO Literacy Portal; United Nations Literacy Decade - International Plan of Action
 UNESCO Literacy Portal; Why the Literacy Decade?

Literacy
Literacy Decade, United Nations
UNESCO